Big Prairie Township is an inactive township in New Madrid County, in the U.S. state of Missouri.

Big Prairie Township takes its name from a prairie of the same name within its borders.

References

Townships in Missouri
Townships in New Madrid County, Missouri